The Weser is a river of Lower Saxony in north-west Germany. It begins at Hannoversch Münden through the confluence of the Werra and Fulda. It passes through the Hanseatic city of Bremen. Its mouth is  further north against the ports of Bremerhaven and Nordenham. The latter is on the Butjadingen Peninsula. It then merges into the North Sea via two highly saline, estuarine mouths.

It connects to the canal network running east-west across the North German Plain.

The Werra rises in Thuringia, the German state south of the main projection (tongue) of Lower Saxony.

Etymology
"Weser" and "Werra" are the same words in different dialects. The difference reflects the old linguistic border between Central and Low German, passing through Hannoversch Münden.

The name likely derives from the Old Germanic *waisōn "flow, ooze". It is cognate with the Wear in England and Vistula (Polish Wisła, German Weichsel) in Poland, all of which are derived from the Proto-Indo-European root *weys- "to flow", which also gives rise to Old English/Old Frisian wāse "mud, ooze", Old Norse veisa "slime, stagnant pool", Dutch waas "haze; soggy land" (see Waasland), Old Saxon waso "wet ground, mire", Old High German wasal "rain" and French vase "mud, sludge".

Course
The Weser starts at the confluence of the Fulda and the Werra. It then runs down to the Porta Westfalica between two high hill ranges, the Wiehengebirge, west and the Weserbergland in the east.

Between Minden and the North Sea, humans have largely canalised the river up to a limit of 1,200-ton ships. Eight hydroelectric dams stand at the ends of adjacent weirstreams that make up the river. The navigation is linked west to the Dortmund–Ems Canal via the Coastal Canal. It is linked east at Bremerhaven to the Elbe.

A large reservoir, the Edersee, on the Eder, the main tributary of the Fulda, is used to allow enough water depth for shipping year-round. The dam, built in 1914, was bombed and severely damaged by British aircraft in May 1943, causing great destruction and about 70 deaths downstream. It was rebuilt within four months. The reservoir is a major summer resort area. Turbines driven by its sluices provide electricity.

The Weser enters the North Sea in the southernmost part of the German Bight. In the sea it splits into two arms – the riverbed at the end of the last ice age. These sea arms are called Alte Weser (old Weser) and Neue Weser (new Weser). They are the waterways for ships heading for the ports of Bremerhaven, Nordenham, and Bremen. The Alte Weser Lighthouse marks the northernmost point of the Weser. This replaced the Roter Sand Lighthouse in 1964.

Tributaries
The largest tributary of the Weser is the Aller, which joins south of Bremen. Tributaries of the Weser and the Werra (from source to mouth) are:

Modes of the list:
 Listed upstream, but sides seen with the flow
 Distances ("km …") from the hydrographical limit towards the sea
 "II", "III"and "IV" mark distances of secondary/tertiary tributaries from the confluence with the Weser etc.
 After the names, lengths and basin sizes are given.
 Lengths with longer affluents are given behind the slash, lengths including an upper course with another name with "or"

List:
 km 19, right: Geeste (in Bremerhaven), 42.5 km, 338 km2
 km 33, right: Lune, 43 km, 383 km2
 km 35.9, right: Drepte, 37.6 km, 101 km2
 km 52.8, left: Hunte, 189 km, 2.785 km2
 II: km 125.7: Lake Dümmer
 km 67.6, right: Lesum, 9.9 or 131.5, 2,188 km2
 II: km 9.9, right Hamme, 48.5 km, 549 km2
↑ main stream: Wümme, 118 / 120, 1,585 km2
 km 72.5, left: Ochtum, 25.6 or 45 km, 917 km2
 II: km 25.6: left Hache, 33 km, 118 km2
 km 125.6, right: Aller, 260 km, 15,744 km2
 II: km 63.6, left: Leine, 278 km, 5,617 km2, stronger than river Aller above
 III: km 112.7, right: Innerste, 99.7 km, 1,264 km2
 III: km 192.8, right: Rhume, 44 km, 1,193 km2, stronger than river Leine above
 IV: km 15.6, right: Oder, 56 km, 385 km2, headwater of the strongest waterway of Aller system
 II: km 97.3, right: Örtze, 62 / 70 km, 760 km2
 II: km 140.7, left: Oker, 218 km, 1822 km2, stronger than river Aller above
 km 184.6, right: Steinhuder Meerbach
 ↑ km II: 29 lake Steinhuder Meer
 km 188.7, left: Große Aue, 84.5 km, 1,522 km2
 km 261.3, left: Werre, 71.9 km, 1485 km2
 II: km 12.7, left: Else, 34.6 km, 416 km2, branch of the Hase, an affluent of Ems
 km 287.7, left: Exter, 26.1 km, 109 km2
 km 323.3, left: Emmer, 61.8 km, 535 km2
 km 387.5, left: Nethe, 50.4 km, 460 km2
 km 406.5, left: Diemel, 110.5 km, 1,762 km2
 km 451.5, left: Fulda, 220.4 km, 6.947 km2
 II: km 45.3, left: Eder, 176.1 km, 3,361 km2, headwater of the strongest waterway of Weser system
 III: km 17.1, left: Schwalm, 97.1 km, 1.299 km2
 ↑ III: km 49.4–70.5: Edersee reservoir
 II: 120.1, right: Haune, 66.5 km, 500 km2
 ↑ main stream above km 451.5: Werra, 299.6 km, 5.497 km2
 km 566.5, right: Hörsel, 55.2 or 64.3, 784 km2
 km 9.8, right: Nesse, 54.5 km, 426 km2
 km 513.1, left: Ulster, 57.2 km, 421 km2
 km 604.4, right: Schleuse, 34.2 km, 283 km2

Notable towns
Main towns along the Weser are (from the head of the river to its mouth): Hann. Münden, Beverungen, Höxter, Holzminden, Bodenwerder, Hamelin, Hessisch Oldendorf, Rinteln, Vlotho, Bad Oeynhausen, Porta Westfalica, Minden, Petershagen, Nienburg, Achim, Bremen, Brake, Nordenham, Bremerhaven.

Popular culture
The river features in the legend and folk tale the Pied Piper of Hamelin.

References

Etymology
 Dieter Berger: Geographische Namen in Deutschland. Duden-Verlag, Mannheim 1999.
 Hans Krahe: Sprache und Vorzeit. Quelle & Meyer, Heidelberg 1954. (Zur alteuropäischen Hydronomie.)
 Julius Pokorny: Indogermanisches etymologisches Wörterbuch. Francke, Bern 1959.

Geology 
 Karsten Meinke: Die Entwicklung der Weser im Nordwestdeutschen Flachland während des jüngeren Pleistozäns. Diss., Göttingen 1992. Mit Bodenprofilen der Weserstädte.
 Ludger Feldmann und Klaus-Dieter Meyer (Hrsg.): Quartär in Niedersachsen. Exkursionsführer zur Jubiläums-Hauptversammlung der Deutschen Quartärvereinigung in Hannover. DEUQUA-Exkursionsführer, Hannover 1998, page 89ff.
 Hans Heinrich Seedorf und Hans-Heinrich Meyer: Landeskunde Niedersachsen. Natur und Kulturgeschichte eines Bundeslandes. Volume 1: Historische Grundlagen und naturräumliche Ausstattung. Wachtholz, Neumünster 1992, page 105ff.
 Ludger Feldmann: Das Quartär zwischen Harz und Allertal mit einem Beitrag zur Landschaftsgeschichte im Tertiär. Papierflieger, Clausthal-Zellerfeld 2002, page 133ff and others.

Archaeology 
 Bremer Archäologische Blätter, Beiheft 2/2000 zur gleichnamigen Ausstellung im Focke-Museum: Siedler, Söldner und Piraten, Chauken und Sachsen im Bremer Raum,  Der Landesarchäologe Bremen, .
 Bremer Archäologische Blätter, Beiheft 3/2004 zur gleichnamigen Ausstellung im Focke-Museum: Gefundene Vergangenheit, Archäologie des Mittelalters in Bremen,  Der Landesarchäologe Bremen, . (wg.Geschichte des Weserarms Balge)

History 
 Georg Bessell: Geschichte Bremerhavens. Morisse, Bremerhaven 1927, 1989.
 Heinz Conradis: Der Kampf um die Weservertiefung in alter Zeit. In: Bremisches Jahrbuch. Bremen 41.1944.
 J. W. A. Hunichs: Practische Anleitung zum Deich-, Siel- und Schlengenbau. Erster Theil, von den Sielen. Bremen 1770.
 Die Kanalisierung der Mittelweser. Published by the Mittelweser AG, Carl Schünemann Verlag, Bremen 1960.
 Kuratorium für Forschung im Küsteningenieurswesen: Die Küste. In: Archiv für Forschung und Technik an der Nord- und Ostsee. Boyens, Heide 51.1991.

Description 

 Karl Löbe: Das Weserbuch. Niemeyer, Hameln 1968.
 Nils Aschenbeck, Wolf Dietmar Stock: Eine Flussfahrt von der Aller bis zur Nordsee. Atelier im Bauernhaus, Fischerhude 1998. .

 
 
Rivers of Lower Saxony
Rivers of Bremen (state)
Bodies of water of the North Sea
Federal waterways in Germany
Rivers of Germany